Izette Griesel (born 12 July 1992) is a South African netball player. She was selected to represent the South African netball team at the 2019 Netball World Cup.

References

1992 births
Living people
South African netball players
2019 Netball World Cup players
Sportspeople from Pretoria